Gord Donnelly (born April 5, 1962) is a Canadian former professional ice hockey defenceman. He played in the National Hockey League with the Quebec Nordiques, Winnipeg Jets, Buffalo Sabres, and Dallas Stars. He is currently an amateur scout for the Chicago Blackhawks.

Born in Montreal Canada,  He was selected in the third round, 62nd overall, of the 1981 NHL Entry Draft by the St. Louis Blues. In his NHL career he  appeared in 554 games and scored 28 goals, plus added 41 assists and  2,069 penalty minutes. Donnelly played in 1010 regular season  professional games. Had a total of  3707 penalty minutes during an 18 year on ice career.

His son Dillon played in the QMJHL, and was drafted by the Colorado Avalanche in 2011. He won the Memorial Cup with the Shawinigan Cataractes in 2012.

Career statistics

See also
List of NHL players with 2,000 career penalty minutes

References

External links

1962 births
Living people
Anglophone Quebec people
Buffalo Sabres players
Canadian ice hockey defencemen
Chicago Blackhawks scouts
Chicago Wolves (IHL) players
Chicoutimi Saguenéens (QMJHL) players
Dallas Stars players
Fredericton Express players
Houston Aeros (1994–2013) players
Ice hockey people from Montreal
Kalamazoo Wings (1974–2000) players
Laval National players
Laval Voisins players
Nashville Predators scouts
Quebec Nordiques players
St. Louis Blues draft picks
Salt Lake Golden Eagles (CHL) players
Sherbrooke Castors players
Winnipeg Jets (1979–1996) players
Canadian expatriate ice hockey players in the United States